Fangchinoline is an isolate of Stephania tetrandra that has anticancer activity.

External links
 Fangchinoline Induces G1 Arrest in Breast Cancer Cells Through Cell-Cycle Regulation

Phytochemicals